Afrojavanica melaena is a moth in the family Erebidae. It was described by George Hampson in 1901. It is found on Java.

References

Moths described in 1901
Spilosomina
Moths of Indonesia